Garry Terence Park (born 19 April 1983 in Empangeni, KwaZulu-Natal) is a South African-born English cricketer. He is a right-handed batsman and a right-arm medium-fast bowler.

Park initially represented CUCCE, during the 2003 season, representing them for the first time in April 2003, joining Durham in the summer of 2006. Due to a lack of first-team opportunities, he joined Derbyshire in October 2008 and left the club in July 2012.

Park made his debut first-class century for Durham in 2006. He represented England as a substitute fielder in the 1st Test versus his native country on 12 July 2008.

References

External links
Garry Park at Cricket Archive

1983 births
Living people
South African cricketers
Durham cricketers
Derbyshire cricketers
Unicorns cricketers
Cambridgeshire cricketers
Norfolk cricketers
Buckinghamshire cricketers
People from Empangeni
Cambridge MCCU cricketers
South African expatriate sportspeople in England
Cricketers from KwaZulu-Natal